Events from the year 1991 in Croatia.

Incumbents
President - Franjo Tuđman
Prime Minister - Josip Manolić

Events
31 March – Plitvice Lakes incident
19 May - Croatian independence referendum
7 October - Bombing of Banski dvori
18 November - Three-month siege of Vukovar ends in surrender of Croatian troops
19 December – Republic of Serbian Krajina proclaimed.
19 December – Croatia is officially recognized by Germany and Iceland.
23 December - Croatian dinar introduced.

Arts and literature

Sport
Basketball club KK Cedevita Zagreb founded.
Basketball club KK Jugoplastika renamed KK Pop 84 Split.
Football club NK Imotski founded.
Handball club RK Partizan Bjelovar renamed RK Bjelovar.

Births

 January 19 - Petra Martić, tennis player
 June 19 - Andrej Kramarić, footballer
 July 7 - Franka Batelić, singer
 November 30 - Monika Babok, swimmer

Deaths
January 5 - Zvonko Lepetić, actor
May 17 - Slavko Stolnik, painter
May 25 - Vinko Pintarić, serial killer and outlaw
July 1 - Josip Reihl-Kir, police chief
August 9 - Gordan Lederer, photographer and cameraman
September 21 - Ante Paradžik, politician
October 16 - Boris Papandopulo, composer and conductor
November 20 - Siniša Glavašević, journalist
November 20 - Antun Stipančić, table tennis player
November 29 - Franjo Majetić, actor

References

 
Years of the 20th century in Croatia
1990s in Croatia
Croatia
Croatia